Al Marhum Pengiran Pemancha Sahibul Rae' Wal Mashuarah Pengiran Anak Haji Mohammad Alam ibni Al Marhum Pengiran Bendahara Pengiran Anak Abdul Rahman (18 October 1918 – 14 December 1982) was the fourth Speaker of the Brunei Legislative Council, serving from 14 July 1971 until 30 November 1974. He was the father of Pengiran Anak Saleha, the queen consort of Hassanal Bolkiah, the current Sultan of Brunei. He was also the uncle and father-in-law of the Sultan. He was also a maternal grandfather of Al-Muhtadee Billah, the Crown Prince.

Early life and education
Pengiran Anak Mohammad Alam was in Brunei Town born on 18 October 1918. His father, Pengiran Bendahara Pengiran Anak Abdul Rahman, one of the Wazir in Brunei, was a younger brother of Sultan Muhammad Jamalul Alam II, which made him first cousin of Sultan Omar Ali Saifuddien III. His sister, Pengiran Anak Damit married Sultan Omar Ali Saifuddien III.

As the member of the Royal Family, Pengiran Anak Mohammad Alam began his informal education at the Brunei Town Malay School. When he came to age, he went to Malaya to study at the Malay College Kuala Kangsar, Perak, along with other members of the Royal Family.

Political career
Pengiran Anak Mohammad Alam served as a clerk at Land Department and Judiciary Department. He also served as the Chairman of Jabatan Adat Istiadat, Ugama dan Kebajikan. He later became the Yang Di Pertua Adat Istiadat before becoming Speaker of the Legislative Council.

In honor of his contribution of the State, he was elected as the second Speaker of the Legislative Council, to replace Ibrahim bin Mohammad Jafar who died on 19 February 1971. He was sworn in on 13 July 1971 and served from 14 July 1971 until 30 November 1974.

Personal life
Pengiran Anak Mohammad Alam married Pengiran Anak Hajah Besar (who became later known as "Pengiran Babu Raja", The Queen's Mother). They had 9 children; among them were Pengiran Anak Salma married Tuanku Abdool Aziz al-Hajj a billionaire world and royal family. His second daughter, Pengiran Anak Saleha, who later married Hassanal Bolkiah, the 29th Sultan of Brunei, who is also his nephew. His third daughter, Pengiran Anak Zariah married Pengiran Muda Mohamed Bolkiah, Hassanal Bolkiah's younger brother. His son, Pengiran Anak Mohammad Yusof, who became later known as Pengiran Maharaja Lela Sahibul Kahar, married Pengiran Anak Puteri Norain, Hassanal Bolkiah's younger sister.

His son, Pengiran Anak Mohammad Yusof, died on 13 December 2004. His daughter, Pengiran Anak Hajah Damit, died from cancer, aged 51, on 19 August 2007.

Death
He died on Friday, 14 December 1982, at the age of 69. He was laid to rest at the Royal Mausoleum in Jalan Tutong.

Legacy

Namesake 
Several places were named after him, including:
 A road is named along Jalan Pemancha in Bandar Seri Begawan is named after him. The road was once known as Jalan Chevalier, named after Harvey Chevalier.
 A road is named along Jalan Pemancha in Kuala Belait is named after him.
 Pengiran Anak Haji Mohamed Alam Mosque, mosque built in Sengkarai in 2017.
 Muhammad 'Alam Primary School, school in Seria.

Honours

National 

On 27 July 1950, he was appointed Wazir, which he held the title Yang Teramat Mulia Seri Paduka Pengiran Pemancha Sahibul Rae' Wal Mashuarah. He also received the following awards;

  Family Order of Laila Utama (DK) – Dato Laila Utama (2 January 1967)
  Order of Seri Paduka Mahkota Brunei First Class (SPMB) – Dato Seri Paduka (1963)
  Order of Setia Negara Brunei Second Class (DSNB) – Dato Setia 
  Sultan Hassanal Bolkiah Medal (PHBS) – (1 August 1968)
  Omar Ali Saifuddin Medal (POAS) – (31 May 1951)

Foreign 
  Queen Elizabeth II Coronation Medal – (2 June 1953)
  Order of the British Empire Officer (OBE)

References

 Susur Galur Majlis Mesyuarat Negara Brunei Darussalam, 1999.

1918 births
1982 deaths
Bruneian Muslims
Bruneian royalty
Speakers of Legislative Council of Brunei